Zachary Cooks (born March 4, 1999) is an American college basketball player for UBSC Graz of the Austrian Basketball Superliga. He has previously played for the Hofstra Pride of the Colonial Athletic Association (CAA), and the NJIT Highlanders in college.

High school career
Cooks began his high school career at Norcross High School. For his junior season, he transferred to Berkmar High School and led the team to the Georgia Sweet 16. Cooks averaged 11.4 points  and 2.5 assists per game as a junior. He committed to playing college basketball for NJIT.

College career
Cooks averaged 8.5 points, 2.2 rebounds and 2.1 assists per game as a freshman. As a sophomore, he averaged 17.6 points, 4.8 rebounds and 2.1 assists per game, earning Second Team All-ASUN honors. On November 20, 2019, he scored a school-record 35 points in a 77–75 loss to Binghamton. Cooks averaged 19.7 points, 5.2 rebounds and 2.2 assists per game as a junior and repeated on the Second Team All-ASUN. He declared for the 2020 NBA draft after the season, but ultimately returned to NJIT. As a senior, Cooks averaged 17.1 points, 4.9 rebounds, and 1.5 assists per game. He was named to the Third Team All-America East. Following the season, Cooks took advantage of the additional season of eligibility granted by the NCAA and transferred to Hofstra. On January 22, 2022, he scored 19 points and passed the 2,000 career point mark in a 72–50 win over Northeastern. Cooks was named Colonial Athletic Association Sixth Man of the Year.

Career statistics

College

|-
| style="text-align:left;"| 2017–18
| style="text-align:left;"| NJIT
| 30 || 1 || 22.1 || .455 || .432 || .732 || 2.2 || 2.1 || 1.6 || .2 || 8.5
|-
| style="text-align:left;"| 2018–19
| style="text-align:left;"| NJIT
| 35 || 35 || 37.3 || .451 || .349 || .732 || 4.8 || 2.1 || 2.5 || .1 || 17.6
|-
| style="text-align:left;"| 2019–20
| style="text-align:left;"| NJIT
| 30 || 30 || 37.6 || .405 || .305 || .778 || 5.2 || 2.2 || 1.8 || .1 || 19.7
|-
| style="text-align:left;"| 2020–21
| style="text-align:left;"| NJIT
| 19 || 19 || 37.7 || .411 || .337 || .718 || 4.9 || 1.5 || 2.2 || .1 || 17.1
|- class="sortbottom"
| style="text-align:center;" colspan="2"| Career
| 114 || 85 || 33.4 || .428 || .347 || .746 || 4.2 || 2.0 || 2.0 || .1 || 15.7

References

External links
Hofstra Pride bio
NJIT Highlanders bio

1999 births
Living people
American men's basketball players
Basketball players from Georgia (U.S. state)
Hofstra Pride men's basketball players
NJIT Highlanders men's basketball players
Norcross High School alumni
People from Lawrenceville, Georgia
Point guards